Eli Ellis (born 4 October 1948) is an Australian former sports shooter. He competed at the 1984 Summer Olympics.

References

1948 births
Living people
Australian male sport shooters
Olympic shooters of Australia
Shooters at the 1984 Summer Olympics
Shooters at the 1978 Commonwealth Games
Shooters at the 1982 Commonwealth Games
Place of birth missing (living people)
Commonwealth Games gold medallists for Australia
20th-century Australian people
21st-century Australian people
Commonwealth Games medallists in shooting
Medallists at the 1982 Commonwealth Games